The men's 1500 metres races of the 2013–14 ISU Speed Skating World Cup 6, arranged in the Thialf arena, in Heerenveen, Netherlands, was held on 15 March 2014.

Denis Yuskov of Russia won the race, while Koen Verweij of the Netherlands came second, and Zbigniew Bródka of Poland came third.

Result
The race took place on Saturday, 15 March, scheduled at 15:22.

Division A

References

Men 1500
6